Ayman (also spelled as Aiman, Aimen, Aymen, or Eymen in the Latin alphabet) is an Arabic masculine given name. It is derived from the Arabic Semitic root for right, and literally means righteous, he who is on the right, right-handed, blessed or lucky.

An early bearer of the name was Ayman ibn Ubayd, an early Muslim and companion of the Islamic prophet Muhammad.

It is a masculine name in the Arabic language. However, in Pakistan, Ayman is used both as a masculine and feminine name. This may be because of the popular woman figure Umm Ayman, who raised Muhammad, whom parents name their daughter after. Her first name was Barakah, and Umm Ayman was her kunya, with "Umm" meaning mother of, and Ayman being the name of her eldest son, Ayman ibn Ubayd.

In Turkey, the name is spelled as Eymen. Eymen was the second most popular given name for boys born in the country in 2016, 2017, 2018 and 2019.

In Malaysia, Aiman was the 24th most popular name for male newborns in 2012.

Notable people
Ayman ibn Ubayd, early Muslim and son of Umm Ayman
Aiman Khwajah Sultan, Prince of Moghulistan
Ayman al-Zawahiri, leader of al-Qaeda, 2011-2022
Ayman Al-Hussaini, Kuwaiti footballer
Ayman Hariri, Lebanese businessman and son of Rafic Hariri
Ayman Safadi, Jordanian Minister of Foreign Affairs 
Aimen Dean, founding member of Al-Qaeda
Ayman Mohyeldin, Egyptian-American journalist 
Ayman Majali, Former Deputy Prime Minister of Jordan
Ayman Al-Hujaili, Saudi footballer 
Ayman Ftayni, Saudi footballer 
Ayman Al-Salek Syrian actor 
Ayman Al-Sayyad, Egyptian journalist 
Aymen Hussein, Iraqi footballer
Aymane Serhani, Moroccan singer 
Ayman Sadiq, Bangladeshi entrepreneur and internet personality 
Ayman Ben Mohamed, Irish-Tunisian footballer
Ayman Adais, Jordanian basketball player
Ayman Cherkaoui, Moroccan climate change lawyer 
Aiman Hakim Ridza, Malaysian actor and singer 
Aiman Witjaksono, Indonesian journalist and host of Aiman (TV program)
Ayman al-Fayed, Palestinian commander of al-Quds Brigades
Ayman Al-Hindi, Palestinian footballer
Ayman Ashraf, Egyptian footballer
Aymen Belaïd, Tunisian footballer
Ayman Ben Hassine, Tunisian cyclist
Aymen Bouchhioua, Tunisian footballer
Aymen Ben Ahmed, Tunisian athlete 
Ayman Hefny, Egyptian footballer 
Ayman Yahya, Saudi footballer 
Ayman Mahmoud, Egyptian pentathlete
Ayman Moheb, Egyptian footballer
Ayman Al-Khulaif, Saudi footballer
Ayman Jumean, Jordanian fencer
Ayman Mohamed Hussein, Somali footballer 
Ayman Mohamed Fayez, Egyptian fencer 
Ayman Shawky, Egyptian footballer 
Ayman Saied Joumaa, Colombian-Lebanese drug trafficker 
Aymen Ben Amor, Tunisian footballer
Aiman Abdallah, German-Egyptian TV presenter
Aimen Demai, Tunisian footballer 
Ayman Halawani, Saudi film producer
Aymen Mathlouthi, Tunisian footballer
Ayman Nour, Egyptian politician and former member of parliament, founder and chairman of El-Ghad Party
Ayman Odeh, Palestinian politician
Ayman Saeed Abdullah Batarfi, Yemeni doctor and former Guantanamo Bay detainee
Aymen Tahar, British footballer of Algerian descent, 
Ayman Taher, Egyptian former goalkeeper
Ayman Zeidan, Syrian TV host, comedian, voice actor and actor of film, television, and theater
Ayman Zohry, Egyptian demographer/geographer and expert on migration studies
Aiman Napoli, Italian footballer 
Aiman Al-Hagri, Yemeni footballer
Aiman Al Ziyoud, Jordanian television producer  
Fakrul Aiman Sidid, Malaysian footballer 
Aiman El-Shewy, Egyptian judoka
Ayman Sawaf, author 
Ayman Otoom, Jordanian poet and novelist 
Ayman Asfari, Syrian-born British businessman
Prince Muhammad Aiman of Brunei, son of Prince Al-Muhtadee Billah, Crown Prince of Brunei
Abu Ayman al-Iraqi, top ISIL commander (1965–2014)
Abu Ayman al-Masri, Egyptian leader of al-Qaeda in the Arabian Peninsula
Ayman Lotfy, Egyptian fine art photographer 
Ayman Sikseck, Israeli-Arab author
Ayman Baalbaki, Lebanese painter 
Ayman Sabawi Ibrahim, nephew of Saddam Hussein
Ayman Ben Mohamed, Tunisian footballer 
Ayman Alatar, Libyan singer 
Ayman El Hassouni, Moroccan footballer 
Ayman Abu Fares, Jordanian footballer 
Ayman Younes, Egyptian footballer 
Ayman Taha, senior Hamas official 
Ahmed Ayman Mansour, Egyptian footballer 
Ayman Kamel, Egyptian ambassador to Japan
Ayman Al-Hendy, Egyptian-American doctor 
Ayman Hakeem, Syrian football coach
Aimen Rizouk, Algerian chess player
Ayman Zeidan, Syrian TV host
Aiman Khan, Pakistani Actress

See also
Abu Ayman (disambiguation)
Aiman

References

Arabic masculine given names